Matthew Knights (born 5 October 1970) is an Australian rules football coach and former player who is currently serving as an assistant coach with the West Coast Eagles.
Knights played in the midfield for the Richmond Football Club from 1988 to 2002, before going on to forge a coaching career, most notably as head coach of the Essendon Football Club from 2008 to 2010. He later became the head coach of the Geelong VFL Football Club from 2012–14, guiding the Cats to the 2012 VFL Premiership and the 2013 VFL Grand Final.

Playing career
Knights wore the number 33 guernsey in 279 games between 1988-2002 for the Tigers whom he captained between 1997-2000. Playing in Richmond's midfield for the majority of his career, Knights was known for his ball winning ability if not his athleticism.  Gifted with excellent "vision" or spatial awareness, and consistently reliable delivery from his left boot, given time and space Knights was one of the most damaging midfielders in the AFL throughout the 90s.

Though rewarded with numerous individual honors playing in a mediocre team, Knights made only two appearances with the Tigers in the AFL Finals Series in 1995 and 2001.  He was placed top four in the team's annual best and fairest vote seven times between 1990 and 2000, and tied for fourth place in the Brownlow Medal count of 1995.

Knights' career was interrupted by a serious ankle injury in Round 2 of 1996 and a knee injury in the pre-season Ansett Cup competition in 1997.  Late in 1998 he became one of the first high-profile AFL players to be diagnosed with the debilitating groin condition osteitis pubis, which dogged him through much of the remainder of his career.  His courage in leading his team despite these set-backs made him much admired by his team's supporters and his removal as captain just before the beginning of the 2001 season caused much controversy (despite this, Richmond went on to finish the season as preliminary finalists). In Round 2 he was the centre of a further public controversy when struck behind play by Western Bulldogs player Tony Liberatore, who was suspended for five matches as a result.  Inability to maintain high expectations saw Knights' retirement as a player towards the end of the 2002 season.

Coaching career

Early career
Knights was quickly recruited as assistant coach for the SANFL Port Adelaide Magpies and replaced Stephen Williams as senior coach the following year. Having played a major role in restructuring the club's playing list, but without having reached the finals, he resigned at the end of 2004 by mutual consent to become the senior coach the Bendigo Bombers in the VFL, while also acting as an assistant coach with the Essendon Football Club in the AFL for the 2007 season.

Essendon Football Club senior coach
In July 2007, Essendon announced that long-standing senior coach Kevin Sheedy would be replaced at the end of the 2007 AFL season and in September 2007, Knights was appointed as the club's new senior coach.

In 2009, Knights coached Essendon to its first finals series since 2004, but the team was soundly beaten by Adelaide in the elimination final.

In the 2010 season, Essendon won seven games and failed to make the finals. Criticism of Knights coaching performance increased during the season. On 12 August 2010, Essendon's CEO Ian Robson stated that Knights would continue as senior coach in 2011, but he was, nonetheless, sacked two weeks later on the day after Essendon's final round loss to the Western Bulldogs.  He had two years remaining on his contract. Essendon won 25, drew one and lost 41 matches under Knights, during which they enjoyed three consecutive victories against Alastair Clarkson and the Hawthorn Football Club.  Knights was replaced by James Hird as Essendon Football Club senior coach.

Other coaching roles

For the 2011 season, Knights worked with the Xavier College football team in Kew.

During the 2012 season Knights was coach of the Geelong VFL Football Club. He coached the team to the 2012 VFL premiership. In 2015, he was promoted to midfields coach.

On September 13, 2021, Knights left Geelong, and was hired by the West Coast Eagles as midfields coach.

Statistics

Playing statistics

|-
|- style="background-color: #EAEAEA"
! scope="row" style="text-align:center" | 1988
|style="text-align:center;"|
| 33 || 4 || 3 || 8 || 42 || 21 || 63 || 17 || 4 || 0.8 || 2.0 || 10.5 || 5.3 || 15.8 || 4.3 || 1.0 || 0
|-
! scope="row" style="text-align:center" | 1989
|style="text-align:center;"|
| 33 || 19 || 9 || 8 || 192 || 147 || 339 || 47 || 32 || 0.5 || 0.4 || 10.1 || 7.7 || 17.8 || 2.5 || 1.7 || 4
|- style="background-color: #EAEAEA"
! scope="row" style="text-align:center" | 1990
|style="text-align:center;"|
| 33 || 22 || 19 || 7 || 348 || 203 || 551 || 63 || 52 || 0.9 || 0.3 || 15.8 || 9.2 || 25.0 || 2.9 || 2.4 || 3
|-
! scope="row" style="text-align:center" | 1991
|style="text-align:center;"|
| 33 || 22 || 16 || 11 || 317 || 218 || 535 || 81 || 34 || 0.7 || 0.5 || 14.4 || 9.9 || 24.3 || 3.7 || 1.5 || 17
|- style="background-color: #EAEAEA"
! scope="row" style="text-align:center" | 1992
|style="text-align:center;"|
| 33 || 22 || 16 || 12 || 289 || 225 || 514 || 67 || 34 || 0.7 || 0.5 || 13.1 || 10.2 || 23.4 || 3.0 || 1.5 || 5
|-
! scope="row" style="text-align:center" | 1993
|style="text-align:center;"|
| 33 || 20 || 11 || 15 || 290 || 216 || 506 || 65 || 44 || 0.6 || 0.8 || 14.5 || 10.8 || 25.3 || 3.3 || 2.2 || 13
|- style="background-color: #EAEAEA"
! scope="row" style="text-align:center" | 1994
|style="text-align:center;"|
| 33 || 20 || 14 || 11 || 221 || 162 || 383 || 49 || 42 || 0.7 || 0.6 || 11.1 || 8.1 || 19.2 || 2.5 || 2.1 || 8
|-
! scope="row" style="text-align:center" | 1995
|style="text-align:center;"|
| 33 || 24 || 12 || 7 || 306 || 222 || 528 || 53 || 72 || 0.5 || 0.3 || 12.8 || 9.3 || 22.0 || 2.2 || 3.0 || 16
|- style="background-color: #EAEAEA"
! scope="row" style="text-align:center" | 1996
|style="text-align:center;"|
| 33 || 10 || 1 || 3 || 87 || 66 || 153 || 36 || 24 || 0.1 || 0.3 || 8.7 || 6.6 || 15.3 || 3.6 || 2.4 || 0
|-
! scope="row" style="text-align:center" | 1997
|style="text-align:center;"|
| 33 || 11 || 2 || 4 || 129 || 87 || 216 || 34 || 22 || 0.2 || 0.4 || 11.7 || 7.9 || 19.6 || 3.1 || 2.0 || 8
|- style="background-color: #EAEAEA"
! scope="row" style="text-align:center" | 1998
|style="text-align:center;"|
| 33 || 20 || 6 || 4 || 289 || 229 || 518 || 56 || 61 || 0.3 || 0.2 || 14.5 || 11.5 || 25.9 || 2.8 || 3.1 || 18
|-
! scope="row" style="text-align:center" | 1999
|style="text-align:center;"|
| 33 || 22 || 5 || 4 || 254 || 210 || 464 || 55 || 44 || 0.2 || 0.2 || 11.5 || 9.5 || 21.1 || 2.5 || 2.0 || 6
|- style="background-color: #EAEAEA"
! scope="row" style="text-align:center" | 2000
|style="text-align:center;"|
| 33 || 22 || 11 || 6 || 240 || 212 || 452 || 82 || 52 || 0.5 || 0.3 || 10.9 || 9.6 || 20.5 || 3.7 || 2.4 || 9
|-
! scope="row" style="text-align:center" | 2001
|style="text-align:center;"|
| 33 || 25 || 12 || 9 || 234 || 230 || 464 || 75 || 65 || 0.5 || 0.4 || 9.4 || 9.2 || 18.6 || 3.0 || 2.6 || 7
|- style="background-color: #EAEAEA"
! scope="row" style="text-align:center" | 2002
|style="text-align:center;"|
| 33 || 16 || 4 || 2 || 118 || 134 || 252 || 44 || 31 || 0.3 || 0.1 || 7.4 || 8.4 || 15.8 || 2.8 || 1.9 || 0
|- class="sortbottom"
! colspan=3| Career
! 279
! 141
! 111
! 3356
! 2582
! 5938
! 824
! 613
! 0.5
! 0.4
! 12.0
! 9.3
! 21.3
! 3.0
! 2.2
! 114
|}

Coaching statistics

|- style="background-color: #EAEAEA"
! scope="row" style="text-align:center; font-weight:normal" | 2008
|style="text-align:center;"|
| 22 || 8 || 14 || 0 || 36.4% || 12 || 16
|-
! scope="row" style="text-align:center; font-weight:normal" | 2009
|style="text-align:center;"|
| 23 || 10 || 12 || 1 || 45.7% || 8 || 16
|- style="background-color: #EAEAEA"
! scope="row" style="text-align:center; font-weight:normal" | 2010
|style="text-align:center;"|
| 22 || 7 || 15 || 0 || 31.8% || 14 || 16
|- style="background-color: #EAEAEA"
|- class="sortbottom"
! colspan=2| Career totals
! 67
! 25
! 41
! 1
! 38.1%
! colspan=2|
|}

Honours
 Richmond Football Club Best and Fairest 1990, 1992
 Richmond Football Club Captain 1997-2000
 All-Australian 1998
 Richmond Football Club Team of The Century
 AFL Life Member
 VFL Premiership Coach 2012

References

External links

 

Richmond Football Club players
Essendon Football Club coaches
Port Adelaide Magpies coaches
Victorian State of Origin players
Jack Dyer Medal winners
All-Australians (AFL)
1970 births
Living people
People educated at Melbourne High School
Australian rules footballers from Victoria (Australia)